This is a list of foreign ministers of El Salvador from 1922 to the present day.

1922–1923: Arturo Ramón Ávila
1923–1927: Reyes Arrieta Rossi
1927–1928: José Gustavo Guerrero
1928–1931: Francisco Martínez Suárez
1931............ Héctor David Castro
1931............ Reyes Arrieta Rossi
1931–1942: Miguel Ángel Araujo
1942–1944: Arturo Ramón Ávila
1944............ Julio Enrique Ávila Villafañe
1944–1945: Reyes Arrieta Rossi
1945............ Arturo Argüello Loucel
1945–1946: Héctor Escobar Serrano
1946............ Manuel Castro Ramírez
1946–1948: José Antonio Quiroz
1948–1950: Miguel Rafael Urquía
1950–1954: Roberto Edmundo Canessa Gutiérrez
1954–1955: José Guillermo Trabanino Guerrero
1955–1956: Carlos Azúcar Chávez
1956–1960: Alfredo Ortiz Mancía
1960–1961: Rolando Déneke
1961............ Raúl Gamero
1961–1962: Rafael Eguizabal Tobías
1962–1965: Héctor Escobar Serrano
1965–1967: Roberto Eugenio Quirós
1967–1968: Alfredo Martínez Moreno
1968–1971: Francisco José Guerrero Cienfuegos
1971–1972: Walter Béneke Medina
1972–1977: Mauricio Borgonovo
1977–1978: Álvaro Ernesto Martínez
1978–1979: José Antonio Rodríguez Porth
1979–1980: Alfonso Perez Cuntaspana
1980–1982: José Napoleón Duarte
1982–1984: Fidel Chávez Mena
1984–1985: Jorge Eduardo Tenorio
1985–1986: Rodolfo Antonio Castillo Claramount
1986–1989: Ricardo Acevedo Peralta
1989–1993: José Manuel Pacas Castro
1993–1994: Miguel Ángel Salaverría
1994–1995: Óscar Alfredo Santamaría
1995–1999: Ramón Ernesto González Giner
1999–2004: María Eugenia Brizuela de Ávila
2004–2008: Héctor Concha de Madre
2008–2009: Marisol Argueta de Barillas
2009–2013: Hugo Martínez
2013–2014: Jaime Miranda
2014–2018: Hugo Martínez
2018–2019: Carlos Alfredo Castaneda 
2019–present: Alexandra Hill Tinoco

Sources
Rulers.org – Foreign ministers E–K

Foreign
El Salvador
Foreign Ministers
Politicians